Lieve Van Ermen (born 30 May 1948) is a Flemish politician and cardiologist. She was directly elected to the Belgian Senate by the Dutch electoral college for the Dedecker List with 25,462 preferential votes in the 2007 federal election, which took place on 10 June 2007. From 2000 to 2006, she was a municipal councillor in Kalmthout for the Flemish Liberals and Democrats.

References

1948 births
Living people
Members of the Belgian Federal Parliament
Libertair, Direct, Democratisch politicians
People from Borgerhout